The 2017 World Junior Ice Hockey Championship Division III tournament was played in Dunedin, New Zealand, from 16 to 22 January 2017. Division III represents the sixth tier of the World Junior Ice Hockey Championships. The winners – Turkey – were promoted to Division II B for the 2018 tournament. Chinese Taipei returned after a five-year absence. With an increase of teams for 2018, the two bottom-place teams, South Africa and Chinese Taipei, were afterwards moved to a Division III Qualification tournament.

Participants

Results

Preliminary round

Format
The two best ranked teams from each group of the preliminary round advance to the semi-finals, while two last placed teams from both groups play for final placement.

All times are local. (New Zealand Daylight Time – UTC+13)

Group A

Group B

Playoff round

Semifinals

7th place game

5th place game

Bronze medal game

Final

Statistics

Top 10 scorers

Goaltending leaders

(minimum 40% team's total ice time)

Awards

Best players selected by the directorate
 Goaltender:  Raz Werner
 Defenceman:  Yusuf Kars
 Forward:  Rudi Ying

Final ranking

References

External links
IIHF.com
Official site

III
World Junior Ice Hockey Championships – Division III
International ice hockey competitions hosted by New Zealand
Sports competitions in Dunedin
January 2017 sports events in New Zealand
2010s in Dunedin